The Lowe, Willard & Fowler Engineering Company was a College Point, New York City based manufacturer of airplanes founded in December 1915 named for its founders, Edward Lowe Jr., Charles F. Willard, and Robert G. Fowler,

Willard had been previously employed by the Curtiss Aeroplane and Motor Company and Aeromarine and had developed a technique for molding laminated wood to form a monocoque fuselage while Fowler had been the first person to fly west-to-east across the United States. Lowe arranged the majority of the financing, while Fowler recruited Willard.

Fowler and Willard departed the company shortly afterwards in 1916 and Lowe renamed the firm the L-W-F Engineering Company." After their departure from the company, the companies initials were repurposed to refer either to either Laminated Wood Fuselage or Linen, Wire and Fabric. The company was reorganized after Lowe was forced out by company backers in 1917.

Aside from its own designs, of which only the model V and its derivatives, and the J-2 (a US Dehavilland DH-4 modified into a twin engine aircraft) saw series production, LWF built the Curtiss HS-2L, Martin NBS-1  and Douglas DT-2 under licence, and they modified 63 US Dehavilland DH-4As into DH-4Bs.

Following the reduction or cancellation  of orders following the end of World War I and the failure of its post-war designs to win orders, the company declared bankruptcy in 1924.

Aircraft

See also
List of aircraft manufacturers

References

Notes

Citations

Bibliography

Defunct aircraft manufacturers of the United States
Defunct manufacturing companies based in New York City
Companies based in Queens, New York
1915 establishments in New York (state)
1924 disestablishments in New York (state)
American companies disestablished in 1924
American companies established in 1915